Daut is a surname. Notable people with the surname include:

Grete Daut (born 2000), Estonian footballer
Ismail Daut (born 1956), Malaysian academic and politician
Peter Daut (born 1983), American journalist
Ryan Daut (born 1984), American poker player

See also
Daut